Carlos R. Clark (born August 10, 1960) is an American retired professional basketball player.

A 6'4" shooting guard from the University of Mississippi, Clark played two seasons (1983–1985) in the National Basketball Association with the Boston Celtics.  He averaged 2.4 points per game and won a championship with the Celtics in 1984.

After being waived by the Celtics in 1986, Clark played in the CBA, the WBL, the PBA in the Philippines and in Belgium where he was a key member of Bobcat Gent when they won the Belgian Cup in 1992.

Notes

1960 births
Living people
African-American basketball players
20th-century African-American sportspeople
21st-century African-American people
Alaska Aces (PBA) players
American expatriate basketball people in Belgium
American expatriate basketball people in Canada
American expatriate basketball people in the Philippines
American men's basketball players
Basketball players from Tennessee
Bay State Bombardiers players
Boston Celtics draft picks
Boston Celtics players
Evansville Thunder players
La Crosse Catbirds players
Ole Miss Rebels men's basketball players
People from Somerville, Tennessee
Philippine Basketball Association imports
Shooting guards